The shuttles hoppfish or shuttles mudskipper (Periophthalmus modestus) is a species of mudskippers native to fresh, marine and brackish waters of the northwestern Pacific Ocean from Vietnam to Korea and Japan.  This species occurs in muddy estuaries, tidal flats and swamps and marshes and is capable of remaining out of the water for up to 60 hours so long as it is kept moist.  This species can reach a length of  TL.  This species can also be found in the aquarium trade and is also used in traditional Chinese medicine.

Common places in Hong Kong, Taiwan, and Southeast Asia and other places of mangrove wetlands.

References 

shuttles hoppfish
Fish of Japan
Fish of Korea
Fish of Taiwan
Marine fauna of East Asia
shuttles hoppfish